Pindad APS-2 or APS-2 (Angkut Personel Sedang-2; English: Medium Personnel Carrier), also known as APS-1V1 is a military armored vehicle made by Pindad, Indonesia. This armored vehicle is the development of prototype APR-1V 4×4 wheel drive run by BPPT and Pindad. The results of this development and refinement resulted in APS-1 with 6×4 and APS-2 6×6 wheel drive, with a chassis derived from Perkasa trucks.

History
The APS vehicle prototype (also known as APS-1) was built using the Perkasa truck chassis made by the Wahana Perkasa Auto Jaya (PT Texmaco) factory, Subang, West Java. The APS-1 armored vehicle can be loaded with 13 soldiers in which the driver sits in a separate cabin right next to the engine housing. Furthermore, the APS-1 design was again refined by Pindad and BPPT by giving birth to the APS-1 V1 variant (also known as APS-2).

The position of the engine is shifted from the driver's side to the center. This allows the commander and the rider to sit next to each other which can also help increase situational awareness for the driver. At first glance, the APS-2 design resembles the Anoa 6×6 armored car. The first appearance of the APS-2 version in public was during the 2006 PTI (Pameran Teknologi & Industri - Technology & Industry Exhibition) at the Plaza Parkir Timur Senayan, 19–22 September 2006.

Previously, it was believed that the Ministry of Defense and Security of the Republic of Indonesia had ordered a total of 150 APS-2 6×6 units. On January 13, 2010, 33 APS-2 armored units were handed over, so the total number of armored vehicles that have been submitted to the Ministry of Defense is 93 out of 150 APS-2 6×6 armored units and 4 reconnaissance units ordered by the Ministry of Defense, while the remaining 61 units with contract value of Rp473 billion is planned to be completed in 2010. Of the 33 units submitted, 13 units will be used by TNI troops for peacekeeping missions in Lebanon. However, there seems to be a naming error in this order, where the actual order is the APS 6×6 which is Anoa.

See also 
 VAB
 Pindad APR-1V
 Pindad APS-1
 Pindad APS-3

References

External links 
 PT Pindad Panser 6x6 
 Army Technology
 Republika Online

Wheeled armoured personnel carriers
Post–Cold War military equipment of Indonesia
Military vehicles introduced in the 2000s
Six-wheeled vehicles
Military vehicles of Indonesia